Ski-orienteering at the 2019 Winter Universiade was held at the Raduga Cluster of the Winter Sports Academy in Krasnoyarsk from 4 to 10 March. It was the first edition of that sport at the Winter Universiade.

Men's events

Women's events

Mixed events

Medal table

References

External links
Results
Results Book – Ski-orienteering

 
Ski-orienteering
2019